Thomas Hall (May 25, 1936 – August 20, 2021), known professionally as Tom T. Hall and informally nicknamed "the Storyteller," was an American country music singer-songwriter and short-story author. He wrote 12 No. 1 hit songs, with 26 more that reached the Top 10, including the No. 1 international pop crossover hit "Harper Valley PTA" and "I Love", which reached No. 12 on the Billboard Hot 100. He is included in Rolling Stones list of 100 Greatest Songwriters.

Early life and career
Hall was born in Tick Ridge, seven miles from Olive Hill, Kentucky, on May 25, 1936. As a teenager, he organized a band called the Kentucky Travelers that performed before movies for a traveling theater. Hall enlisted in the U.S. Army in 1957, serving in Germany. While in the service, he performed over the Armed Forces Radio Network and wrote comic songs about army experiences. Following his discharge in 1961, he used G.I. Bill education benefits to enroll at Roanoke College where he worked as a disc jockey. His early career included being an announcer at WRON, a local radio station in Ronceverte, West Virginia. Hall was also an announcer at WMOR (1330 AM) in Morehead and WGOH (1370 AM) in Grayson, both in Kentucky. Hall was also an announcer at WSPZ, which later became WVRC Radio in Spencer, West Virginia, in the 1960s.

Hall's big songwriting break came in 1963, when country singer Jimmy C. Newman recorded his song "DJ For a Day". In 1964, he moved to Nashville and started to work as a $50-a-week songwriter for Newkeys Music, the publishing company belonging to Newman and his business partner Jimmy Key, writing up to half a dozen country songs per day. Key suggested that he add the middle initial "T" to his name. Hall was nicknamed "The Storyteller", and he composed songs for dozens of country music stars, including Johnny Cash, George Jones, Loretta Lynn, Waylon Jennings, Alan Jackson, and Bobby Bare. He also penned "Hello Vietnam", a song that openly supported the Vietnam War at a time when war protest songs were beginning to dominate the pop music chart. The song proved to be a hit for country singer Johnnie Wright and was later used in the 1987 Vietnam War movie Full Metal Jacket.

One of his earliest successful songwriting ventures, "Harper Valley PTA", recorded in 1968 by Jeannie C. Riley, hit No. 1 on the Billboard Hot 100 and Hot Country Singles charts a week apart. It sold over six million copies and won both a Grammy Award and CMA Award. The song would go on to inspire a motion picture and television program of the same name. Hall himself recorded the song for his album The Definitive Collection (as track No. 23). His recording career took off after Riley's rendition of the song, releasing a number of hits from the late 1960s through the early 1980s. Some of his biggest hits include "A Week in a Country Jail", "(Old Dogs, Children and) Watermelon Wine", "I Love", "Country Is", "The Year Clayton Delaney Died", "I Like Beer", "Faster Horses (the Cowboy and the Poet)", and "That Song Is Driving Me Crazy". One of his best known numbers, "Pamela Brown," was recorded by Leo Kottke and became a staple of his performances. He is also noted for his child-oriented songs, including "Sneaky Snake" and "I Care", the latter of which hit No. 1 on the country charts in 1975. His song "I Love", in which the narrator lists the things in life that he loves, was recorded by Heathen Dan, with completely altered lyrics, as "I Like" and appeared many times on the Dr. Demento show in the early 1980s. Hall's song was also used with altered lyrics and a hard rock arrangement in a popular 2003 TV commercial for Coors Light. In the mid-to-late 1970s, Hall was a commercial spokesperson for Chevrolet trucks.

Hall succeeded Ralph Emery as host of the syndicated country music TV show Pop! Goes the Country in 1980 and continued until the series ended in 1982. Hall largely retired from writing new material in 1986 and from performing in 1994; his last public performance, which was also his first in several years, was in 2011.

Awards and honors
Hall won the Grammy Award for Best Album Notes in 1973 for the notes he wrote for his album Tom T. Hall's Greatest Hits. He was nominated for, but did not win, the same award in 1976 for his album Greatest Hits Volume 2. He was a member of the Grand Ole Opry from 1971. In 1998 his 1972 song "(Old Dogs, Children and) Watermelon Wine" came in second in a BBC Radio 2 poll to find the UK's favorite easy listening record, despite never having been a hit in the UK and being familiar to Radio 2 listeners mostly through occasional plays by DJ Terry Wogan.

Hall was inducted into the Kentucky Music Hall of Fame in 2002. On February 12, 2008, Hall was inducted into the Country Music Hall of Fame. In regard to Hall's longer-than-anticipated wait to be inducted, he attributed it to being somewhat reclusive and "not well liked" among the Nashville music industry, noting that he almost never collaborated with other songwriters and by the 1990s was largely out of step with the corporate style of country music. On June 1, 2014, Rolling Stone ranked "(Old Dogs, Children and) Watermelon Wine" at No. 93 on their list of the 100 greatest country songs. In November 2018 Hall and his wife Dixie Hall were inducted into the International Bluegrass Music Hall of Fame. On June 13, 2019, Hall was inducted into the Songwriters Hall of Fame. Of all the honors he had received in his lifetime, he considered this induction to be his proudest moment and the pinnacle of his achievement, also stating that he was taken by surprise for even being considered.

Together with his wife Dixie Hall he won the Society for the Preservation of Bluegrass Music of America Bluegrass Song Writer of the Year award in 2002, 2003, 2004, 2005, 2007, 2008, 2009, 2010, 2011, 2013, 2014, and 2015.

Personal life
Hall was married to Opal "Hootie" McKinney, a native of Grayson, Kentucky. Their son, Dean Todd Hall, was born on June 11, 1961. Dean worked for his father in the early 1980s, first as a roadie and later as a guitarist. Dean has since worked as a solo artist and with Bobby Bare's band.

Hall met bluegrass songwriter Dixie Hall in 1965. Tom and Dixie met at a 1965 music industry award dinner she was invited to for having written (as Dixie Deen) the song "Truck Drivin' Son-of-a-Gun" which became a hit for Dave Dudley. Dixie Hall was born Iris Lawrence in the West Midlands, England, in 1934 and emigrated to the U.S. in 1961. Hall and Dixie were married from 1968 until her death on January 16, 2015. They lived in Franklin, Tennessee.

Death
At age 85, Hall died at his home in Franklin, Tennessee, on August 20, 2021 of a self-inflicted gunshot wound to the head; the cause of death went unreleased and had been presumed to be natural until the Williamson County medical examiner released his findings in November. Hall left no suicide note, had chlordiazepoxide (used to treat anxiety and alcohol withdrawal) in his system at the time of his death and was rumored to have been suffering from numerous old age-related illnesses at the time.

Selected discography

In Search of a Song (1971)
We All Got Together and... (1972)
Places I've Done Time (1978)
Song in a Seashell (1985)

Books written by Hall
How I Write Songs, Why You Can (1976), Chappell Music Co. 
The Songwriter's Handbook (1976), Rutledge Hill Press 
The Storyteller's Nashville (1979), Doubleday & Co.; (Spring House Press, 2016), 
The Laughing Man of Woodmont Coves (1982), Doubleday & Co. 
The Acts of Life (1986), The University of Arkansas Press 
Spring Hill, Tennessee (1990), Longstreet Press, Inc. 
What a Book! (1996), Longstreet Press, Inc.

See also
:Category:Songs written by Tom T. Hall
:Category:Tom T. Hall songs
:Category:Tom T. Hall albums

References

Further reading 
Allen, Bob. (1998). "Tom T. Hall". In The Encyclopedia of Country Music. Paul Kingsbury, Editor. New York: Oxford University Press. pp. 224–5.
Harris, Stacy (1993). "Tom T. Hall", In The Best of Country: The Essential CD Guide. San Francisco: Collins Publishing, pp. 52–53.

External links
 [ Tom T. Hall page at allmusic.com]
 Tom T. Hall at Discogs.com
 Blue Circle Records
 Interview with Tom T. Hall – NAMM Oral History Library (2008)
 

1936 births
2021 deaths
2021 suicides
American country singer-songwriters
Country Music Hall of Fame inductees
Country musicians from Kentucky
Grammy Award winners
Grand Ole Opry members
Members of the Country Music Association
Mercury Records artists
People from Carter County, Kentucky
RCA Records artists
Singer-songwriters from Kentucky
Suicides by firearm in Tennessee